Babacar Dione (born 4 October 1961) is a Senegalese judoka. He competed in the men's lightweight event at the 1988 Summer Olympics.

References

1961 births
Living people
Senegalese male judoka
Olympic judoka of Senegal
Judoka at the 1988 Summer Olympics
Place of birth missing (living people)